There was no women's tournament held in the previous year. Sandra Cecchini and Raffaella Reggi were the champions in the 1985 edition. Both players competed this year with different partners. Cecchini teamed up with Sabrina Goleš and lost in the second round to tournament runners-up Claudia Kohde-Kilsch and Helena Suková, while Reggi teamed up with Anne White and lost in the first round to Virginia Ruzici and Catherine Tanvier.

Martina Navratilova and Gabriela Sabatini won the title by defeating Claudia Kohde-Kilsch and Helena Suková 6–4, 6–1 in the final.

Seeds
The first four seeds received a bye to the second round.

Draw

Finals

Top half

Bottom half

References

External links
 Official results archive (ITF)
 Official results archive (WTA)

1987 Italian Open (tennis)
Italian Open
Italian Open (Tennis), 1987
Italian Open